Penstemon linarioides is a plant species in the genus Penstemon. Its common names include toadflax penstemon, toadflax beardtongue and Colorado narrowleaf beardtongue. It grows in Nevada, Arizona, Utah, Colorado, and New Mexico.

References

linarioides
Flora of the Western United States
Flora without expected TNC conservation status